The Temir-Khan-Shurinsky okrug was a district (okrug) of the Dagestan Oblast of the Caucasus Viceroyalty of the Russian Empire. The area of the Temir-Khan-Shurinsky okrug is included in contemporary Dagestan of the Russian Federation. The district's administrative centre was Temir-Khan-Shura (present-day Buynaksk).

Administrative divisions 
The subcounties (uchastoks) of the Temir-Khan-Shurinsky okrug were as follows:

Demographics

Russian Empire Census 
The majority of the population indicated Kumyk to be their mother tongue, with significant Avar-Andean, Dargin, and Russian speaking minorities.

Kavkazskiy kalendar 

Notes

References

Bibliography 

Okrugs of Dagestan Oblast